Elizabeth Sewall "Lizzie" Alcott (June 24, 1835 – March 14, 1858) was one of the two younger sisters of Louisa May Alcott. She was born in 1835 and died at the age of 22 from scarlet fever.

Biography 
She was originally named Elizabeth Peabody Alcott in honor of her father Bronson's teaching assistant at the Temple School and close friend of her mother, Abba. By age three, however, after a falling out between Bronson and Elizabeth Peabody, her name was changed to Elizabeth Sewall Alcott, after her mother's mother, Dorothy Sewall May.

In her semi-autobiographical novel, Little Women (1868), Louisa May Alcott represented her sister  as Beth. She wrote:

In 1856, Lizzie contracted scarlet fever while helping a poor German family. Although she recovered, she was permanently weakened. Her father Bronson was on a tour of the Western United States and had reached as far as Cincinnati when he heard that Lizzie, known to be ill, had taken a turn for the worse. By February 1858, she refused to take medicine and told her father, "I can best be spared of the four." As time went by, she grew weaker and thinner. On March 14, 1858, Lizzie Alcott died in her sleep. She was only 22 years old, about 3 months short of her 23rd birthday.  On the same day, Louisa wrote in her journal:

At the moment of her death, Louisa, her mother, and the doctor saw a ghost-like mist rising from Lizzie's body. Her funeral was a small affair, with Ralph Waldo Emerson, Henry David Thoreau and Franklin Benjamin Sanborn serving as pallbearers. Lizzie was interred at Sleepy Hollow Cemetery.

References

LaPlante, Eve. Marmee & Louisa: The Untold Story of Louisa May Alcott and Her Mother. New York: Simon & Schuster, 2012: 81. 

Alcott family
1835 births
1858 deaths
People from Concord, Massachusetts
Deaths from streptococcus infection
Sewall family
Quincy family